Clayton Alexander Fortune (born 10 November 1982) is an English former footballer who played as a defender.

He spent the first six years of his career at Bristol City, between 2001 and 2006. He then began a two-year spell with Leyton Orient, before signing with Darlington in summer 2008. Between 2005 and 2007 he also enjoyed two lengthy loan spells with Port Vale. He spent the 2009–10 season with Weston-super-Mare, before returning to the English Football League with Aldershot Town for the 2010–11 season. After leaving Clevedon Town he missed a season of football, he joined Mangotsfield United in June 2012, before switching to Chippenham Town four months later and then making a return to Clevedon Town. He returned to Weston-super-Mare as player-coach in June 2014, before joining Hereford in November 2016. He helped Hereford to win the Southern League Division One South & West title in 2016–17 and later returned to Mangotsfield United.

Career
Fortune started his career with Tottenham Hotspur, but left for Bristol City, having never appeared for the former. Signing his first professional contract in March 2001, he made his debut on 4 December 2001, replacing Joe Burnell 82 minutes into a 2–1 win over Peterborough United in the League Trophy. He became a first regular for the first time in the 2004–05 season, as City finished one point outside the play-offs.

He had a long-term loan spell with Port Vale from November 2005 to the end of the season. During this spell he made a number of man-of-the-match appearances and scored his first professional goals, netting against Blackpool and Walsall.

Vale manager Martin Foyle planned to buy Fortune in April 2006, and gave the player the club's Young Player of the Year award. A five-figure fee was agreed with City, however the deal fell through as he rejected personal terms with the club. He then had trials at both Derby County and Queens Park Rangers. Instead he transferred to Leyton Orient in August 2006, unwanted at City. By November 2006, he found himself back at Vale Park, again on loan until the end of the season.

The 2007–08 season was spent with Orient, however he missed much of it due to dislocated shoulder and was released upon its conclusion, allowing him to sign with League Two Darlington. He spent November 2008 at Conference side Rushden & Diamonds, making just he once appearances before returning to Darlington. Fortune signed for Conference South side Weston-super-Mare in July 2009. He made a total of 31 appearances, scoring five goals for the club, who narrowly escaped relegation. In July 2010, Fortune signed a one-year contract with Aldershot Town after impressing on trial. He made just three league starts, and was not offered a new contract at the end of the season. He then spent a brief spell with Southern League club Clevedon Town, who were managed by former Vale teammate Mickey Bell.

He signed with Southern League side Mangotsfield United in June 2012, in what was described as a "huge coup for the club". Fortune made his debut for Mangotsfield in a 1–0 home defeat to Cirencester Town on 18 August. On 3 October, he moved up a division to join Chippenham Town, having impressed against the club in an FA Cup clash with Mangotsfield. However, he left the club just four weeks later after playing just two games; manager Nathan Rudge said that he "never really got going with us". He returned to Clevedon Town in November 2012. The "Seasiders" finished 15h in 2012–13 and 17th in 2013–14.

He re-joined former club Weston-super-Mare in June 2014 after manager Mickey Bell appointed him as player-coach. The "Seagulls" finished 17th in 2014–15 and 16th in 2015–16. He served as captain at the start of the 2016–17 season, but was released in November 2016 after new manager Scott Bartlett announced his intention to rebuild the playing squad.

In November 2016, he returned to the Southern League Division One South & West to sign with Hereford, who were managed by former Bristol City teammate Peter Beadle. Despite the "Bulls" winning the 2016–17 title by an 18-point margin, Fortune admitted that he had struggled with injuries throughout the campaign. He was released in May 2017. He rejoined Mangotsfield United for the 2018–19 and 2019–20 seasons.

Style of play
Fortune is strong and powerful with good heading ability. Primarily a central defender, he can also play at left-back or in midfield.

Personal life
His father, Everton Richards, was an apprentice at Tottenham Hotspur. His cousin is former Charlton Athletic defender Jonathan Fortune, and his uncle is Leo Fortune-West. He is a first cousin of rapper Kano.

After leaving the professional game as a player, he worked as a football consultant for agency firm Sports Management International.

Career statistics

Honours
Hereford
Southern League Division One South & West: 2016–17

References

External links

How to do a 'Clayton Fortune Special' from the BBC

1982 births
Living people
Footballers from Forest Gate
People educated at St Bonaventure's Catholic School
Black British sportspeople
English footballers
Association football defenders
Tottenham Hotspur F.C. players
Bristol City F.C. players
Port Vale F.C. players
Leyton Orient F.C. players
Darlington F.C. players
Rushden & Diamonds F.C. players
Weston-super-Mare A.F.C. players
Aldershot Town F.C. players
Clevedon Town F.C. players
Mangotsfield United F.C. players
Chippenham Town F.C. players
Hereford F.C. players
English Football League players
National League (English football) players
Southern Football League players
Association football coaches